Voice of America Persian News Network (VOA-PNN) is a governmental international broadcaster of the United States of America in Persian language. Its headquarters are in Washington D.C. It started to broadcast its programs on 18 October 1994 with a one-hour television program. Its radio programs started on 22 November 1979 with 30 minutes broadcasting per day.

Managers 

The first manager of the VOA-PNN was Ahmadreza Baharloo. Later managers were Kambiz Mohammadi, Shila Ganji, Behrouz Abbassi, Behrouz Souresrafil, James Glassman, Hida Fouladvand and Ramin Asgard. The current manager of the VOA-PNN is Setareh Derakhshesh.

Programs 
As of July 2007, VOA-PNN broadcast 1 hour of radio programming a day, 7 hours a day of original programming for television, and a website.

Original series 
 Parazit (2008–2012)
 OnTen (2012–2015)

Interview with Abdolmalek Rigi 
In April 2007, VOA-PNN conducted a phone interview with Abdolmalek Rigi, the leader of Jundallah (which was later designated as a Foreign Terrorist Organization in 2010 by the U.S.) and introduced him as the leader of the "popular resistance movement". Following the event, Iran accused the U.S. of supporting terrorists by giving them the opportunity to speak. The New York Times Magazine quoted Mehdi Khalaji as "[VOA administrators] do not seem to be able to distinguish between journalism and propaganda. If you host the head of Jondollah and call him a freedom fighter or present a Voice of America run by monarchists, Iranians are going to stop listening". The act resembled the "hallmark of ideological objectivity" in VOA, and was criticized as an "irresponsible American embrace of violent regime change", according to Suzanne Maloney.

References

External links
 Official website 

1994 establishments in Washington, D.C.
1979 establishments in Washington, D.C.
American radio networks
Television networks in the United States
Organizations based in Washington, D.C.
Persian-language radio stations
Persian-language television stations
Voice of America